L'Ascension (literally: "The Ascension"; official translation: "Ascension Day") is a suite of four symphonic meditations for orchestra which, with the exception of its third movement, were later arranged for pipe organ in 1933-1934. The work was written by the French-Belgian composer Olivier Messiaen from 1932 to 1933 in Paris, Neuchâtel, and Monaco. It was premièred under the direction of Robert Siohan at the Salle Rameau in Paris on 9 February 1935. It is one of his first major works (the first such for orchestra); and, in both of its iterations, among his most well-known.

The work is in four movements and uses modes of limited transposition and complex rhythms, which are characteristic of Messiaen's compositional style. Nevertheless, the work is rooted in tonality and uses key signatures. It is as follows:

 Majesté du Christ demandant sa gloire à son Père ("The Majesty of Christ Demanding His Glory of the Father")
 Alléluias sereins d’une âme qui désire le ciel ("Serene Alleluias of a Soul that Longs for the Heavens")
 Alléluia sur la trompette, alléluia sur la cymbale ("Alleluia on the Trumpet, Alleluia on the Cymbal")
 Prière du Christ montant vers son Père ("Prayer of Christ Ascending Towards His Father")

For the organ version, in response to the fast scherzic textures of the orchestral third movement which were apparently unsuitable for the instrument, the composer gave up arranging it, replacing it with an entirely new toccata in F-sharp major titled Transports de joie d'une âme devant la gloire du Christ qui est la sienne ("Outbursts of Joy From a Soul Before the Self-Fulfiling Glory of Christ"). A complete performance takes around thirty minutes.

The second movement's main theme was originally the theme of a piece for violin and piano called Fantaisie, which was posthumously published.

Both editions were published by Éditions Alphonse Leduc.

History

Development 

The work's earliest sketches (in short-score format) are described as dating from May of 1932 and were written in at 13 villa Danube in Paris, where Messiaen lived. He completed the work in Neuchâtel during July of that year and began orchestrating it in July of the following year in Monaco.

At the time of writing, Messiaen had been teaching at the Schola Cantorum de Paris and had already published a handful of pieces, however, he was mostly known as an organist. He was appointed as titular organist of La Sainte-Trinité following the death of Charles Quef in 1931 and was a former pupil of Marcel Dupré, Charles-Marie Widor, and Paul Dukas.

Messiaen had previously written two symphonic meditations (completely on his own accord: they were not commissioned) and was also working on his third, Hymne au Saint Sacrement.

Controversies 
According to a rumour, due to a dispute between Messiaen and the Alphonse Leduc company, Messiaen offered to arrange the work for organ mostly to appease them and to expand profits from the highly-demanding global organ scene. It was published in 1934, with the actual orchestral version following in 1948. The organ version continues to be more popular than the orchestral original.

Premiere

Orchestral version

Organ version

Instrumentation
The work is scored for the following instruments:

Woodwinds
3 Flutes
2 Oboes
1 Cor anglais
2 Clarinets in A and B-flat
1 Bass clarinet in B-flat
3 Bassoons

Brass
4 Horns
3 Trumpets
3 Trombones
1 Tuba

Percussion
Timpani (3)
Triangle
Cymbals
Tambourine
Bass drum

Strings
Violins I, II
Violas
Cellos
Double Basses

Form

I. Majesté du Christ demandant sa gloire à son Père 
Père, l'heure est venue, glorifie ton Fils, afin que ton Fils te glorifie. (Jean 17:1)"Father, the hour has come, glorify Thy Son, so Your Son may glorify Thee. (John 17:1)"The movement is an opening chorale in E major which is scored for the winds and brass sections alone.

II. Alléluias sereins d’une âme qui désire le ciel

III. Alléluia sur la trompette, alléluia sur la cymbale

IIIa. Transports de joie d'une âme devant la gloire du Christ qui est la sienne (for organ)

IV. Prière du Christ montant vers son Père

Organ version

In 1933–34, Messiaen made a version for solo organ.  The first, second and fourth movements are arrangements of the orchestral pieces, but Messiaen composed a new third movement, Transports de joie d'une âme devant la gloire du Christ qui est la sienne ("Outbursts of joy from a soul before the glory of Christ which is its own glory"), usually just known as Transports de joie..

References
Kennedy, Michael (2006), The Oxford Dictionary of Music, 985 pages,

External links 

 L'Ascension pour orchestre played by the Polish National Radio Symphony Orchestra under the direction of Antoni Wit, synchronised with its sheet music
 L'Ascension pour orgue played by Olivier Messiaen himself at the organ of Sainte-Trinité, 9th arrondissement of Paris, synchronised with its sheet music

1933 compositions
Compositions by Olivier Messiaen